The 1st New York Infantry Regiment was an infantry regiment that served in the Union Army during the American Civil War.

Service
The regiment was organized in New York City, New York and was mustered in for a two-year enlistment on April 22, 1861.

The regiment was mustered out of service on May 25, 1863.

Total strength and casualties
The regiment suffered 79 enlisted men who were killed in action or mortally wounded and 3 officers and 31 enlisted men who died of disease, for a total of 113
fatalities.

Commanders
 Colonel William H. Allen
 Colonel Garret Dyckman
 Colonel John Frederick Pierson

See also
List of New York Civil War regiments

Notes

References
The Civil War Archive

External links
New York State Military Museum and Veterans Research Center - Civil War - 1st Infantry Regiment History, table of battles and casualties, Civil War newspaper clippings, historical sketch, and battle flag for the 1st New York Infantry Regiment.

Infantry 001
1861 establishments in New York (state)
Military units and formations established in 1861
Military units and formations disestablished in 1863